Forcipella is a genus of flowering plants in the family Acanthaceae, with all species native to Madagascar.

Species
Currently accepted species include: 

Forcipella bosseri Benoist
Forcipella cleistochlamys Lindau
Forcipella involucrata Benoist
Forcipella longistaminea Benoist
Forcipella madagascariensis Baill.
Forcipella repanda Benoist

References

Acanthaceae
Acanthaceae genera
Taxa named by Henri Ernest Baillon